Těšínsko (meaning the "Cieszyn Silesia") is a regional magazine, published originally quarterly, currently twice a year by the Muzeum Těšínska in Český Těšín, Czech Republic. It focuses on the history and culture of the Czech part of Cieszyn Silesia.

History and profile
The first issue appeared in November 1957 and since then the magazine appears in black and white A4 format. The publisher is Muzeum Těšínska.

In the 1990s more Polish authors contributed to the magazine, as a consequence the prestige of the magazine grown and it gained more readers.

Many regional historians and researchers contributed to the magazine, e.g. Mečislav Borák, Andělín Grobelný, Bedřich Havlíček, Karol Daniel Kadłubiec, Óndra Łysohorsky, Idzi Panic, Janusz Spyra, Miloš Trapl, Jaroslav Valenta, Rudolf Žáček, Stanisław Zahradnik and others.

Footnotes

References

External links
  Official website

1957 establishments in Czechoslovakia
Magazines published in the Czech Republic
Czech-language magazines
Local interest magazines
Magazines established in 1957
Mass media in Český Těšín
Quarterly magazines
Biannual magazines